Antoine Gael Sahaghian (born 16 December 1988) is a French professional footballer who currently plays for Hong Kong Premier League club HKFC.

Career statistics

Club

Notes

References

External links
 Yau Yee Football League profile

Living people
1988 births
French footballers
Association football midfielders
Hong Kong First Division League players
Hong Kong Premier League players
Hong Kong FC players
French expatriate footballers
French expatriate sportspeople in Hong Kong
Expatriate footballers in Hong Kong